Dewey Township may refer to the following townships in the United States:

 Dewey Township, LaPorte County, Indiana
 Dewey Township, Roseau County, Minnesota
 Dewey Township, Walsh County, North Dakota